The South Western Districts Eagles are a South African rugby union team that participates in the annual Currie Cup and Vodacom Cup tournament. They represent the Southern Cape (Garden Route & Klein Karoo regions) and play out of Outeniqua Park in George.

History
The South Western Districts Rugby Football Union was established in 1899. Initially, home matches were held in Mossel Bay, Oudtshoorn and George, but in 1996, the  SWDRFU made Outeniqua Park in George its home base.

They have never won the Currie Cup, but they did win the Bankfin Cup in 2002 and the Currie Cup First Division in 2007 and 2018 Currie Cup First Division. They also reached the semi-finals of the Currie Cup in their centenary season in 1999 under Heyneke Meyer.

Honors

 Three Currie Cup First Division titles:  2002, 2007, 2018 
 Currie Cup First Division Runner-up: 2009, 2010, 2015

Sevens
The SWDRFU also hosted the South Africa Sevens leg of the IRB Sevens World Series for several seasons at Outeniqua Park. In 2012, they also launched the 7s Premier League tournament in 2012 held at the same venue.

Current squad

The following players were included in the SWD Eagles squad for the 2022 Currie Cup First Division:

References

External links
 
 sport.iafrica.com profile

South African rugby union teams
Rugby clubs established in 1899
1899 establishments in South Africa
Sport in the Western Cape